Abantis is an Afrotropical genus of skipper butterflies. They are also known as the paradise skippers. Their imagos are generally attractive with bold or colourful wing and/or body markings. They occur in either forest or savanna, and several species are very localized or thinly distributed. The territorial males are encountered more often than the females. Males engage territorial intruders, and are prone to very rapid and high flight, while females display more relaxed flight habits, closer to the ground. Plants of several families serve as food plants, and only one egg is oviposited per plant. The larva is pale and spotted to varying degrees, and pupates inside a leaf shelter drawn together by silk threads.

Species
Abantis adelica (Karsch, 1892)
Abantis amneris (Rebel & Rogenhofer, 1894)
Abantis arctomarginata Lathy, 1901
Abantis bamptoni Collins & Larsen, 1994
Abantis bicolor (Trimen, 1864)
Abantis bismarcki Karsch, 1892
Abantis canopus (Trimen, 1864)
Abantis cassualalla (Bethune-Baker, 1911)
Abantis contigua Evans, 1937
Abantis efulensis Holland, 1896
Abantis elegantula (Mabille, 1890)
Abantis eltringhami Jordan, 1932
Abantis hindei (Druce, 1903)
Abantis ja Druce, 1909
Abantis leucogaster (Mabille, 1890)
Abantis levubu (Wallengren, 1857)
Abantis lucretia Druce, 1909
Abantis meneliki Berger, 1979
Abantis meru Evans, 1947
Abantis nigeriana Butler, 1901
Abantis paradisea (Butler, 1870)
Abantis pillaana (Wallengren, 1857)
Abantis pseudonigeriana Usher, 1984
Abantis rubra Holland, 1920
Abantis tanobia Collins & Larsen, 2005
Abantis tettensis Hopffer, 1855
Abantis venosa Trimen, 1889
Abantis vidua Weymer, 1901
Abantis zambesiaca (Westwood, 1874)

References

External links

 Seitz, A. Die Gross-Schmetterlinge der Erde 13: Die Afrikanischen Tagfalter. Plate XIII 76

Tagiadini
Hesperiidae genera
Taxa named by Carl Heinrich Hopffer